Direct Action: An Ethnography is an ethnographic study of the global justice movement written by anthropologist David Graeber and published by AK Press in 2009.

Further reading

External links 

 

2009 non-fiction books
Books about anarchism
English-language books
AK Press books
American non-fiction books
Ethnographic literature
Alter-globalization
Books by David Graeber